Graham Rose may refer to:

Graham Rose (cricketer) (born 1964), former English cricketer for Somerset
Graham Rose (bishop) (born 1944), current bishop of the Catholic diocese of Dundee, South Africa